Hendrick Vroom can refer to:

Hendrick Cornelisz Vroom, Dutch painter
Hendrik Vroom, Gold Coast colonial official and businessman